Inga praegnans is a species of plant in the family Fabaceae. It is found only in the Brazilian state of São Paulo, near the Serra do Mar mountains. This tree flowers in February and March and bears fruit in November.

References

praegnans
Flora of Brazil
Vulnerable plants
Taxonomy articles created by Polbot